Catherine Zoubtchenko (born in 1937)  is a Russian-born French artist most well known for her abstract style of painting. She was born in Leningrad, Russia, and was deported along with her parents to Berlin in 1941 by Nazi Germany. She moved to Paris in 1954 where she started her life as an artist. Zoubtchenko's work has been circulating in the art market for some time. According to Artnet, she has had paintings sold at Auction as early as 1989. Her paintings usually sell for upwards of €6,000 and even up to €20,000. Her work has been commented upon by Jean-Claude Marcadé and exposed in numerous galleries and museums throughout Europe (especially within France and Russia).

Catherine Zoubtchenko is still active and continues to paint in her studio in Paris.

Education 
Catherine Zoubtchenko studied in both the Académie de la Grande Chaumière and Académie Julian between 1954 and 1955. In summer 1958 (at the age of 21) she became the sole pupil of André Lanskoy. Catherine Zoubtchenko worked and lived with Lanskoy for the rest of his life, until death in 1976.

Art-Style 
Typically using gouache or water colours, Catherine Zoubtchenko paints non-figurative abstract works of art.

Exhibitions

Personal Exhibitions 

 Galerie Jacques MASSOL, Paris, 1972
 Restaurant-théâtre Au bec fin, Paris, 1980
 Galerie LA GALÉE, Hollande, 1981
 Centre culturel de Meudon, France, 1982
 Union de Banques à Paris : inauguration de l'agence des Champs-Elysées, 1984
 Galerie TAYLOR, Paris, 1986
 Galerie Verriere, Lyon, 1987
 Galerie Michel Guinle-La Main, Lyon, 1989
 Galerie Marie-Thérèse Wagner, Thionville, 1991
 Galerie "Am Stadtplatz, Aarberg, Suisse, 1992
 Restaurant "Léonidas", Paris, 1997

Museums that Exposed Her Work 

 National Russian Museum, St. Petersburg, Russia
 Fine Art Museum, Bordeaux, France
 The State Tretyakov Gallery, Moscow, Russia
 Fine Art Museum, Lille, France

References

Living people
1937 births
Artists from Saint Petersburg
Artists from Paris